The 1964–65 Algerian Championnat National was the third season of the Algerian Championnat National since its establishment in 1962. A total of 16 teams contested the league, with USM Annaba as the defending champions.

Team summaries

Promotion and relegation 
Teams promoted from Algerian Division 2 1964-1965 
 SCM Oran
 RC Kouba
 JSM Skikda

Teams relegated to Algerian Division 2 1965-1966

 MC Alger
 JSM Tiaret
 USM Alger

League table

Season statistics

Top scorers

Hat-tricks

References

External links
1964–65 Algerian Championnat National

Algerian Ligue Professionnelle 1 seasons
1964–65 in Algerian football
Algeria